INS Jalashwa (Sanskrit/Hindi: Hippopotamus, जलाश्व) is an amphibious transport dock currently in service with the Indian Navy. Formerly , she, along with six Sikorsky SH-3 Sea King helicopters were procured from the United States by India for a total of US$90 million in 2005. She was commissioned on 22 June 2007. INS Jalashwa is the only Indian naval ship to be acquired from the United States. She is based in Visakhapatnam under the Eastern Naval Command.

Description
Jalashwa features a well deck, which can house up to four LCM-8 mechanised landing craft that can be launched by flooding the well deck and lowering the hinged gate aft of the ship. She also has a flight deck for helicopter operations from which up to six medium helicopters can operate simultaneously. The deck can also be used to operate vertical take-off and landing (VTOL) aircraft like the Sea Harrier, in special circumstances. She is also capable of embarking over 1,000 troops, and is fully equipped with extensive medical facilities including four operation theatres, a 12-bed ward, a laboratory and a dental centre.

Acquisition history

The Indian Navy felt the need for better amphibious landing capability in the aftermath of the 2004 Indian Ocean tsunami, when the Navy's rescue and humanitarian efforts were hampered by inadequacy of existing amphibious ships in its fleet. In 2006, the Indian government announced it would purchase the US Navy's retired  landing platform dock  for approximately 228 crore ($48.44 million). Her sister ship  was also offered, but India declined the offer.

The Indian Navy took possession of the ship on 17 January 2007 in Norfolk, Virginia after the transfer agreement was signed by Commodore P Murugesan, Naval Attaché at the Embassy of India to the US, and Rear Admiral Garry E Hall of US Navy. She then underwent a refit at the Norfolk Naval Base until May 2007. The Indian Navy also purchased six UH-3 Sea King maritime utility transport helicopters for $39 million for operation from the ship. Sea Harrier aircraft can be operated from the deck of the ship.

The ship was commissioned as INS Jalashwa on 22 June 2007, at Norfolk by Shri Ronan Sen, then the Indian ambassador to the United States. Captain BS Ahluwalia and Commander Dinesh Singh were her first Commanding Officer and Executive Officer, respectively.

Controversy
The purchase terms of the ship resulted in controversy, with the Comptroller and Auditor General of India censuring the Indian Navy for a hasty purchase without exercising sufficient due diligence and for accepting restrictions on use and access. According to the report, the United States obtained an assurance that the naval ship could not be used for any offensive purposes, and had the right to regularly inspect it, under an end-user monitoring agreement that India and the US signed in 2009. In addition, no physical assessment was done by India prior to purchase and the US Navy reportedly did not reveal the need for upgrades and modifications.

A response to this criticism was that the ship was acquired primarily to aid the Navy in gaining vital operational information for expanding its amphibious warfare capabilities. The Chief of Navy Staff Admiral Nirmal Kumar Verma clarified that inspections by the United States are not intrusive, i.e. no boarding of the ship by US personnel is allowed. A team from the US Department of Defence examined night vision devices, which were taken out of Jalashwa for the inspection.

Service history
On 1 February 2008, five Indian Navy personnel were killed, and three others critically injured by inhaling poisonous hydrogen sulphide (H2S) gas aboard Jalashwa. The mishap occurred during an exercise in the Bay of Bengal, between Visakhapatnam and the Andaman Islands. Jalashwa immediately headed to Port Blair, with the critically injured seamen and two officers being airlifted from the ship.
Lieutenant Commander Shwet Gupta and Lieutenant Ruchir Prasad were critically injured while trying to rescue their sailors. Gupta subsequently died of his injuries.

They carried their full air wings, and a contingent of MARCOS.

INS Jalashwa has undergone two refits. A short one, limited by financial constraints, helped the ship attain higher speeds. The second refit in 2012 was longer, and her radars and sensors were replaced with indigenous equipment. This reduced the navy's dependence on US-origin components, as it was uncomfortable with the US inspection regime.

Gallery

See also
Indian Navy Multi-Role Support Vessel programme
List of active Indian Navy ships

References

External links

 USS Trenton becomes INS Jalashva
 INS Jalashva commissioning ceremony 
 INS Jalashwa – Bharat Rakshak

Austin-class amphibious transport docks of the Indian Navy
1968 ships
Ships built by Lockheed Shipbuilding and Construction Company